Aaadonta fuscozonata fuscozonata is a subspecies of land snail, a terrestrial pulmonate gastropod mollusc in the family Endodontidae. It is endemic to Palau, where it was previously known from Koror, but has only recently been found on a few of the Rock Islands. It is threatened by destruction and modification of its moist lowland forest habitat.

References

Endodontidae
Endemic fauna of Palau
Gastropods described in 1889